White Plum Asanga, sometimes termed White Plum Sangha, is a Zen school in the Hakuyu Taizan Maezumi lineage, created by Hakuyu Taizan Maezumi. It consists of Maezumi's Dharma heirs and subsequent successors and students. A diverse organization spread across the United States and with a small presence in Europe, the White Plum Asanga 

Conceived of informally in 1979 by Maezumi and Tetsugen Bernard Glassman, the White Plum Asanga was named after Maezumi's father Baian Hakujun Dai-osho and then later incorporated in 1995 following Maezumi's death. Tetsugen Bernard Glassman was the White Plum Asanga's first President and his successor was Dennis Genpo Merzel. Following Merzel's term, in May 2007, Gerry Shishin Wick served as elected President of White Plum, until 2013 when Anne Seisen Saunders became the current president.

Notable members

Jan Chozen Bays
Merle Kodo Boyd
Charles Tenshin Fletcher
Tetsugen Bernard Glassman (Past President)
Joan Jiko Halifax
Robert Jinsen Kennedy
John Daido Loori
Peter Muryo Matthiessen
Wendy Egyoku Nakao
Pat Enkyo O'Hara
John Tesshin Sanderson
Gerry Shishin Wick (Past President)
Michael Mugaku Zimmerman

Notable centers
Lost Coin Zen
Still Mind Zendo
Yokoji Zen Mountain Center
Upaya Institute and Zen Center
Kanzeon Zen Center
Zen Center of Los Angeles
Zen Mountain Monastery
Village Zendo
Great Vow Zen Monastery
Sweetwater Zen Center
Zen River
Brevard Zen Center
New York Zen Center for Contemplative Care
Soji Zen Center
Zen Life & Meditation Center 
Great Plains Zen Center

See also
Buddhism in the United States
Timeline of Zen Buddhism in the United States

Notes

References

External links
White Plum website

 

greatwave.org